Dolphin Tale is a 2011 American 3D family drama film directed by Charles Martin Smith, from a screenplay by Karen Janszen and Noam Dromi and a book of the same name. It stars Harry Connick Jr., Ashley Judd, Nathan Gamble, Kris Kristofferson, Cozi Zuehlsdorff in her film debut, and Morgan Freeman. The book and film are inspired by the true story of Winter, a bottlenose dolphin that was rescued in December 2005 off the Florida coast and taken in by the Clearwater Marine Aquarium. In the film, Winter lost her tail after becoming entangled with a rope attached to a crab trap, and was fitted with a prosthetic one.

The film was released on September 23, 2011, by Warner Bros. Pictures; Dolphin Tale received positive reviews from critics and earned $95.9 million on a $37 million budget. A sequel, Dolphin Tale 2, was released on September 12, 2014.

Plot
Sawyer Nelson, a lonely 11-year-old boy, has fallen behind in school since being abandoned by his father five years earlier. His only friend is his cousin Kyle, a champion swimmer who hopes to compete in the Olympics. Kyle leaves to spend time in the army.

One day on his way to summer school, Sawyer finds a fisherman attempting to help an injured dolphin tangled in a crab trap. The dolphin is taken for treatment to Clearwater Marine Aquarium (CMA), run by Dr. Clay Haskett. Clay's daughter Hazel names the dolphin Winter, after two prior dolphins, Summer and Autumn, had been treated successfully and returned to the ocean. Sawyer sneaks in to see Winter, and later starts to visit each day, being harassed by a crazy pelican named Rufus. Sawyer's mother Lorraine and Clay are hesitant, due to Sawyer's inexperience with marine animals, and skipping summer school numerous times, but they realize that the friendship seems to benefit both Winter and Sawyer. Dr. Clay allows the visits to continue, and Lorraine withdraws Sawyer from summer school and lets him volunteer at CMA, and gives him a new wetsuit.

However, Winter's tail is damaged and must be amputated. Winter learns to swim without a tail by developing a side-to-side motion like a fish, but after an X-ray, Clay notices the unnatural motion is causing stress on her spine, which if continued will disable and eventually kill her.

News comes that Kyle has been injured in an explosion and is returning home for treatment. Sawyer is excited to see him, but devastated when Kyle skips his own welcoming party and stays at the local Department of Veterans Affairs Medical Center, where Dr. Cameron McCarthy develops prosthetic limbs. Sawyer and his mother visit Kyle there, but Sawyer is insulted when Kyle asks them to leave. Not wanting to upset Sawyer, Kyle takes Sawyer for a walk and explains his situation and that he needs some time. Sawyer then asks Dr. McCarthy if he could make a prosthetic tail for Winter. McCarthy agrees to do so and convinces his prosthetic supplier Hanger Prosthetics and Orthotics to supply the parts at no cost. Dr. McCarthy manufactures a "homemade" model tail while waiting for the real one to arrive, but Winter rejects it by banging it against the pool wall. Meanwhile, Kyle gets more depressed when his friend and swimming partner, Donovan Peck, beats Kyle's old swimming records. McCarthy persuades Kyle to go home.

The CMA, already in financial peril, is heavily damaged by a hurricane. The board of directors agrees to close up and sell the land to a real estate developer, and finds homes for all the animals except Winter; due to her condition she is not wanted, and may have to be put down. Kyle visits CMA and sees that Winter is like him, with a damaged limb. However, inspired by a girl with a prosthetic limb whose mother drives her 8 hours from Atlanta, Georgia to visit Winter, Sawyer imagines holding a "Save Winter Day" to save the facility. Clay is not convinced, but he reconsiders after talking with his father, Reed. Kyle agrees to race Donovan Peck and persuades Bay News 9 to cover the event.

The Hanger-supplied tail finally arrives; however, Winter rejects it too. Sawyer then realizes what the real problem is: the plastic base for the tail is irritating her skin. Therefore, McCarthy develops an alternative gel-like sock which he calls "Winter's Gel" (which is the real name of the Hanger product used to attach prosthetic limbs, developed during research with Winter). Winter accepts this new prosthetic tail.

At Save Winter Day, the work with Winter impresses everyone. Sawyer's teacher gives him school credit, allowing him to pass summer school. The fisherman who found Winter on the beach comes too. The real estate developer decides to keep CMA open and to support it financially. With Winter's help, Kyle then wins a swimming race against Donovan.

The ending shows documentary footage from Winter's actual rescue, several of the prosthetic tails that Winter has worn, and scenes of real amputees visiting Winter at the Clearwater Marine Aquarium.

Cast
 Nathan Gamble as Sawyer Nelson, an 11-year-old boy who finds Winter and cuts the crab trap off her. He becomes a friend and paternal figure of sorts to Winter.
 Winter as herself, an injured dolphin that must have part of her fluke amputated. Despite that, she adapts and swims side-to-side, but that turns out to be bad for Winter's spine, so the prosthetic fin which allows her to swim naturally is developed.
 Harry Connick Jr. as Dr. Clay Haskett, the operator of the Clearwater Marine Aquarium in Clearwater, Hazel's widowed father and Reed's son.
 Ashley Judd as Lorraine Nelson, Sawyer's divorced mother and a nurse.
 Kris Kristofferson as Reed Haskett, Clay's father and Hazel's grandfather.
 Morgan Freeman as Dr. Cameron McCarthy, a prosthetic designer and Kyle's doctor at the VA Hospital. He agrees to help create a prosthetic tail for Winter.
 Kim Ostrenko as Alyce Connellan, Kyle's mother, Sawyer's aunt, and Lorraine's sister.
 Jim Fitzpatrick as Max Connellan, Kyle's father and Sawyer's uncle. He is also an army veteran.
 Cozi Zuehlsdorff as Hazel Haskett, an 11-year-old girl and the daughter of Clay and granddaughter of Reed. She helps out in the aquarium and becomes friends with Sawyer.
 Ray McKinnon as Mr. Doyle, Sawyer's teacher.
 Austin Stowell as Kyle Connellan, Sawyer's cousin, who is a state swimming champion. At the start of the movie, he leaves to spend time in the army to get money to participate in the Olympics, but is injured and comes home prematurely.
 Michael Roark as Donovan Peck, a friend of Kyle's who is also a state swimming champion.
 Frances Sternhagen as Gloria Forrest, the owner of Clearwater Marine Aquarium.
 Austin Highsmith as Phoebe, the trainer of Clearwater Marine Aquarium.
 Betsy Landin as Kat, one of the Clearwater Marine Aquarium dolphin specialists.
 Juliana Harkavy as Rebecca, one of the Clearwater Marine Aquarium employees
 Tom Nowicki as Philip J. Hordern, a real estate developer.
 Richard Libertini as the fisherman who finds Winter. He later visits during the fundraiser and gives them a generous donation. This would prove to be Libertini's final film role before his death in 2016.
 Zoe Naomi as Lilla Forrest, the daughter of Gloria Forrest.

Differences between the movie and real-life events
In the film, Winter is stranded on Honeymoon Island Beach in Dunedin near Clearwater. She is found lying on the shore by a nearby fisherman and rescued with Sawyer's assistance. In real life, Winter was found in Mosquito Lagoon south of New Smyrna Beach―part of the Cape Canaveral National Seashore. The fisherman who discovered her was in the lagoon, as well. Hubbs-SeaWorld Research Institute Research and stranding team responded to the reported animal, researcher Teresa Mazza-Jablonski stayed with Winter in the water for 7 hours. Winter was first taken to the local Marine Discovery center and then transferred to Clearwater, which is on the opposite side of the state.

In the movie, Winter's tail was amputated due to infection caused from being caught in the rope. In real life, the loss of blood supply to the tail (from being caught in the rope) caused most of the tail to fall off, with only a small piece being amputated.

In the movie, developing Winter's tail takes a few weeks, with a Veteran's Administration doctor working during his vacation. In real life, the process of developing a suitable tail took several months' work by Kevin Carroll and Dan Strzempka and Charles Brown from Hanger Clinic.

Production
Dolphin Tale was filmed in native 3D, beginning in September 2010. It was shot primarily in Pinellas County, Florida, with the principal location being the Clearwater Marine Aquarium. Additional locations featured include: Admiral Farragut Academy, The Long Center, Honeymoon Island, Tarpon Springs, and local news station Bay News 9. Justin Sherbert (stage name: Justin Sherman) of Free Willy fame was initially contacted to train the marine mammal extras, but declined. Dolphin Tale remains the only marine mammal motion picture of the modern era that did not employ Sherbert in at least a consulting capacity.

Soundtrack

Soundtrack list
"World Gone Crazy" - performed by The Doobie Brothers
"Knee Deep" - performed by Zac Brown Band featuring Jimmy Buffett
"Sh-Boom" - performed by The Chords
"Everything Happens To Me" - written by Tom Adair and Matt Dennis
"Ride of the Valkyries" - performed by the Budapest Symphony Orchestra
"I'm Yours" - written and performed by Jason Mraz
"Line Dance" - written and performed by Michael Wells and David Fowler
"Second Guessin'" - written and performed by Jerry King and the Rivertown Ramblers
"Kings Road A "- written by Jens Funke and Josef Peters
"Made for Dancing" - performed by Ron Keel
"Safe" - performed by Westlife

Release
Dolphin Tale was released on September 23, 2011, in North America by Warner Bros. Pictures and Alcon Entertainment, in RealD 3D and 2D.  It opened at number three with $19.2 million behind the 3D re-release of The Lion King and Moneyball. In its second weekend, the film reached the number-one spot, dropping only 27%, and grossed $13.9 million. As of January 5, 2012, the film has grossed $72,286,779 in the United States and Canada, as well as $23,117,618  internationally, bringing its worldwide total to $95,404,397.  The film was released on DVD and Blu-ray at available at iTunes Store and Google Play Store on December 20, 2011.

Reception
Review aggregator Rotten Tomatoes reports that 81% of 111 critics have given the film a positive review; the average rating is 6.5/10. The website's critical consensus reads, "Wisely dialing down the schmaltz, Dolphin Tale is earnest, sweet, and well-told, a rare family film that both kids and parents can enjoy." Metacritic, which assigns a weighted average score out of 100 to reviews from mainstream critics, gives the film a score of 64 based on 31 reviews. Audiences polled by CinemaScore gave the film a rare "A+" on an A+ to F scale.

Awards

Sequel

A sequel titled Dolphin Tale 2 was released on September 12, 2014.

References

External links
 
 
 
 
 
 
 

2011 films
2011 3D films
2010s adventure films
Alcon Entertainment films
American children's adventure films
American children's drama films
Films about dolphins
Drama films based on actual events
Films directed by Charles Martin Smith
Films scored by Mark Isham
Films set in 2005
Films set in Florida
Films shot in Florida
Films with underwater settings
Summit Entertainment films
Warner Bros. films
2011 drama films
Films about amputees
2010s English-language films
2010s American films
Films about disability